Nicodemus Maipampe (born 16 March 1942) is a Zambian sprinter. He competed in the men's 400 metres at the 1972 Summer Olympics.

References

1942 births
Living people
Athletes (track and field) at the 1972 Summer Olympics
Zambian male sprinters
Olympic athletes of Zambia
Athletes (track and field) at the 1970 British Commonwealth Games
Commonwealth Games competitors for Zambia
Place of birth missing (living people)